Ultrapithecus is an extinct genus of oldfieldthomasiid notoungulate that lived during the Middle Eocene of what is now Argentina.

Description

This genus is mostly known from its dentition, and a detailed reconstruction is impossible. It can be supposed that Ultrapithecus was, like its better known relatives, similar in size and appearance with a modern marmot. Its dentition consisted of low-crowned (brachydont) teeth. The molars were devoid of mesostyle, while the premolars lacked the fold of the metacone.

Classification

The genus Ultrapithecus was first described in 1901 by Florentino Ameghino, based on fossil remains found in Argentine terrains dated from the end of the Middle Eocene. Ameghino described two species, Ultrapithecus rutilans and U. rusticulus, and thought that this genus was an archaic primate, hence its genus name, Ultrapithecus, meaning "monkey from the other side", referring to its discovery in South America instead of the Old World. Ultrapithecus was subsequently placed within the order Notoungulata, and the two species are considered synonyms, with U. rutilans taking precedence.

Ultrapithecus has historically been placed with the family Oldfieldthomasiidae, but more recent studies tends to indicate that this family was paraphyletic, with Ultrapithecus being a member of an Eocene adaptive radiation of archaic notoungulates, nested at the basis of the suborder Typotheria. It seems to have been closely related with the genus Kibenikhoria.

References

F. Ameghino. 1901. Notices préliminaires sur des ongulés nouveaux des terrains crétacés de Patagonie [Preliminary notes on new ungulates from the Cretaceous terrains of Patagonia]. Boletin de la Academia Nacional de Ciencias de Córdoba 16:349-429
G. G. Simpson. 1967. The beginning of the age of mammals in South America. Part II. Bulletin of the American Museum of Natural History 137:1-260
R. Cifelli. 1985. Biostratigraphy of the Casamayoran, Early Eocene of Patagonia. American Museum Novitates 2820:1-26

Typotheres
Eocene mammals of South America
Paleogene Argentina
Fossils of Argentina
Taxa named by Florentino Ameghino
Fossil taxa described in 1901
Prehistoric placental genera
Golfo San Jorge Basin
Sarmiento Formation